Grote Prijs Jef Scherens is a single-day road bicycle race held annually in September in Leuven, Belgium. Since 2005, the race is organized as a 1.1 event on the UCI Europe Tour. The race is named after the seven-time professional sprint world champion Jef Scherens.

The local city circuit from the 2021 UCI Road World Championships, hosted in Leuven, was largely based on the circuit that is ridden during the Grote Prijs Jef Scherens.

Winners

External links
 Official Website 

 
UCI Europe Tour races
Recurring sporting events established in 1963
1963 establishments in Belgium
Cycle races in Belgium
Sport in Leuven